Nevşehir is an electoral district of the Grand National Assembly of Turkey. It elects three members of parliament (deputies) to represent the province of the same name for a four-year term by the D'Hondt method, a party-list proportional representation system.

Members 
Population reviews of each electoral district are conducted before each general election, which can lead to certain districts being granted a smaller or greater number of parliamentary seats.

Nevşehir's seat allocation has been remained unchanged at three seats for more than fifty years.

General elections

2011

Presidential elections

2014

References 

Electoral districts of Turkey
Politics of Nevşehir Province